A Little Help with Carol Burnett is an American streaming television series hosted by Carol Burnett who leads a panel of children that offer unscripted advice to celebrities and average people about everyday issues in front of a live audience. The show premiered on May 4, 2018 on Netflix. The series has been confirmed to not be returning for season 2.

Premise
A Little Help with Carol Burnett is a panel show hosted by Carol Burnett who is "joined by a group of straight-talking and entertaining 5 to 9-year-old kids", according to Deadline Hollywood. The children offer their opinions and advice to average adults about issues they face in everyday life, such as issues related to dating, marriage, parenting, self-care, etc. Each episode features a celebrity guest who receives feedback from the child panel after sharing about a personal dilemma.

Cast
Host
 Carol Burnett
Co-Host
 Russell Peters

Panel

 Emmersyn Fiorentino
 Amari McCoy
 Tristan Sutton
 Charlie 
 Seane Mele
 Robert Smith
 Celine Sela Montanye
 Jimi Orekoya
 Caleb Jeon
 Rainey Spurlock
 Hayden Carroll
 AJ Heinicke
 Gavin Reyes
 Ava Clarke

Episodes

Production
On July 31, 2017, it was announced that Netflix had given the production series order for a first season consisting of twelve episodes. Alongside the announcement, it was reported that the series would be produced by Dick Clark Productions.

On April 16, 2018, it was announced that the series would premiere on May 4, 2018. Additionally, it was confirmed that Russell Peters would act as co-host and that Julie Bowen, Candace Cameron Bure, Mark Cuban, Billy Eichner, Taraji P. Henson, Derek Hough, DJ Khaled, Lisa Kudrow, Brittany Snow, Wanda Sykes, and Finn Wolfhard would appear as guests.

References

External links

2018 American television series debuts
2018 American television series endings
2010s American comedy television series
English-language Netflix original programming
Television series about children
Television series by Dick Clark Productions
Carol Burnett